The 2009 Elite League speedway season (also known as the Sky Sports Elite League for sponsorship reasons) was the 75th season of the top division of UK speedway and the 13th since its establishment as the Elite League in 1997.

Summary
The first fixtures of the season took place on 30 March and the season ended on 12 October. The Poole Pirates were the defending champions from 2008.

Leigh Adams had a stellar season, he once again topped the league averages and became the Australian Champion for the 10th time. He also won the Elite League Riders Championship and nearly led Swindon to a title success, before losing in the play off final to Wolverhampton Wolves. Wolves continued their success of recent years courtesy of heavy scoring throughout the season by Freddie Lindgren, Peter Karlsson and their new signing Tai Woffinden.

Lee Richardson top scored for the Lakeside Hammers during the season and the team claimed their first top tier trophy in their history when winning the Knockout Cup.

League table

Home: 3W = Home win by 7 points or more; 2W = Home win by between 1 and 6 points 
Away: 4W = Away win by 7 points or more; 3W = Away win by between 1 and 6 points; 1L = Away loss by 6 points or less
M = Meetings; D = Draws; L = Losses; F = Race points for; A = Race points against; +/- = Race points difference; Pts = Total Points

Championship play-offs

Semi-finals

Leg 1

Leg 2

Grand final

First leg

Second leg

Wolverhampton were declared Elite League Champions, on Aggregate 95-90.

Elite League Knockout Cup
The 2009 Elite League Knockout Cup was the 71st edition of the Knockout Cup for tier one teams.

First round

Quarter-finals

Semi-finals

Final

First leg

Second leg

The Lakeside Hammers were declared Knockout Cup Champions, winning on aggregate 108-77.

Final leading averages

Riders & final averages
Belle Vue

 11.48 (5 matches only)
 8.67
 7.09
 6.65
 6.41
 6.40
 6.38
 6.12
 6.11
 4.18
 2.95
 2.15

Coventry

 8.74
 8.58
 8.28
 7.68
 7.59 
 6.65
 4.72
 4.30
 4.24
 2.72

Eastbourne

 7.63
 7.46 
 6.86
 6.64
 6.09
 5.65
 5.08
 3.90
		

Ipswich

 9.39
 9.30
 8.00
 8.27
 7.40
 6.23
 6.11
 4.86
 4.64
 4.21
 4.16

Lakeside

 8.86
 8.72
 8.46
 8.36
 6.78
 6.26
 5.23
 4.97
 3.78		

Peterborough

 8.26
 8.12
 6.88
 6.80
 5.71
 5.50
 5.02

Poole

 9.77
 9.19 
 8.31
 7.07
 4.31
 4.00
 3.85
 3.79
 3.41
 3.15
 2.14

Swindon

 10.33 
 9.57 
 7.38
 7.22
 7.12
 6.88
 6.59
 6.31
 6.00
 4.36
 4.12

Wolverhampton

 10.64
 9.19 
 8.30
 7.27
 6.03
 5.88
 2.77
 1.88

See also 
 Speedway in the United Kingdom
 List of United Kingdom Speedway League Champions
 Knockout Cup (speedway)

References

SGB Premiership
Elite League
Speedway Elite